Kingston is an English surname. Notable people with the surname include:

Alex Kingston, English actress 
Charles Kingston (1850–1908), Premier of South Australia
Charles Kingston (disambiguation), several other people
Eddie Kingston (born 1981), American professional wrestler
George Strickland Kingston (1807–1880), surveyor and politician in South Australia
Jack Kingston, American politician
Jeff Kingston (born 1957), American author
John de Kingston (died after 1336), English knight
John E. Kingston (1925–1996), New York politician and judge
Judith Kingston (1949–2016), English paediatric oncologist
Kevin Kingston, Australian Rugby League player
Kiwi Kingston, wrestler and actor from New Zealand
Kofi Kingston, ring name of Kofi Sarkodie-Mensah, Ghanaian wrestler
Laryea Kingston (born 1980), Ghanaian footballer
Mark Kingston, English actor
Maxine Hong Kingston, Chinese-American author
Paul Elden Kingston, leader of the Mormon fundamentalist Latter Day Church of Christ
Phil Kingston (born 1936), climate activist and protester in the United Kingdom
Robert Kingston, United States Army General
Russ Kingston, American actor
S. G. Kingston (1848–1897), South Australia lawyer, son of George
Sean Kingston, Jamaican hip hop artist
Tom Kingston (rugby union), Australian rugby union player
Tom Kingston (rugby league), Australian rugby league player
Vera Kingston, English swimmer
Wendy Kingston, Australian newsreader for Nine News
William Kingston, Constable of the Tower of London
William Henry Giles Kingston, English writer

See also
 Kingston (disambiguation)
 Earl of Kingston, a title in the Peerage of Ireland, including Baron Kingston and Viscount Kingston
 Duke of Kingston-upon-Hull, a title in the Peerage of Great Britain, and Earl of Kingston-upon-Hull, a title in the Peerage of England
Richard Kingson, a professional football goalkeeper

English toponymic surnames